Hell Joseon, Hell Chosun or Hell Korea is a satirical South Korean term that became popular around 2015. The term is used to criticize the socioeconomic situation in South Korea. The term first gained popularity among younger Koreans as a result of anxieties and discontentment about unemployment and working conditions in modern South Korean society.

Etymology 
The phrase is a mixture of the words "Hell" and "Joseon", meaning that "(South) Korea is a hellish, hopeless society". Although the term began with private individuals on the internet, it was later adopted by the mass media.

Concept 

The phrase has been used to express opposition towards government policies seen as contributing to youth unemployment, economic inequality, excessive working time, inability to escape from poverty despite hard work, a society that favors vested interests, and general irrationality in daily life. Usage of this term increased through social-networking websites such as Twitter and Facebook, spreading particularly among younger individuals in September 2015.

By 2019, the phrase had been superseded by a new term, "Tal-Jo", a portmanteau comprising "leave" and "Joseon," which might be best be translated as "Escape Hell."

Background 
One widely accepted reason for the rapid spread of the phrase "Hell Joseon" is a growing social discourse and awareness of social inequality in South Korea.

Military 
South Korea operates a compulsory military service draft system. The current military service period is 18 months for the Army and Marines, 20 months for the Navy, and 21 months for the Air Force. Conscripted Koreans spend much of their time in the military where they are disconnected from society. Economic inequality may also materialize through obligatory military service, where those with the resources or connections to avoid service are not subject to hazing or other abuses. These problems lead to many Koreans trying to avoid compulsory military service and draft dodging. Those with wealth or connections use them to gain exemptions or leaving to other countries. Koreans with English language skills may apply for competitive spots to serve with American soldiers as KATUSAs because they believe that they will receive better treatment under the United States Army. Some people attempting to avoid conscription have bribed medical professionals to fake diagnoses so that they could gain exemptions.

Academic requirements 
In South Korea, many young people attend college because they believe they will have a difficult time finding employment without a college education. Reasons behind this include a strong organizational culture related to universities and academic institutions or hometowns. This organizational culture can be seen when interviewing to enter the workplace. If people with the same conditions are interviewed, they will be accompanied by someone from the same school and hometown as the interviewee. This culture exists within companies as well. People who are not from special schools are discriminated against and culled from the hiring process. This causes inequality and dissatisfaction among people. Within the company, people from the same school or from the same region come together to form a faction. As there is fierce competition for desirable jobs, the pressure to succeed and learn in academia is immense. Many Korean schoolchildren attend some sort of extracurricular education, such as cram schools for English.

High population density 
The population density of Korea is 519 people/km2. Seoul is very dense, at around 16,593 people/km2. This level of population causes poverty for many as well, and contributes to competition for desirable jobs (such as those with job security or higher social perception) and living spaces. Some have abandoned their hopes for marriage and children (known as the Sampo generation) as they cannot afford to support a family, or wish to focus on their professional lives.

Cultural influence 
On September 3, 2015, DC Inside opened the Hell Joseon Gallery. Since September 2015, the exposure of the phrase increased considerably online. In addition, DC Inside users can express the oppressed complaints of young people. Several other films, perhaps most prominently the 2019 Parasite, have similarly commented on social inequality in South Korea.

Criticism 
Critics of the term say "the surplus man who does nothing tells the story of Hell Joseon". It is also pointed out that the phrase itself is caused by dissatisfaction with society's inequality or absurdity, but it is also problematic in that it does not actually expect any political actions. Lee Er Young said, "The countries that  want to  leave the Hell Joseon are not heaven" and that "the present employment and inequality situations are a global phenomenon, which is the result of the development of information technology."

Former president of South Korea, Park Geun-hye, said "There are a growing number of new words that deny our great modern history and disparage our world that is envied as a place to live," as a way of criticizing the trend of the phrase "Hell Joseon." She added, "Self-depreciation, pessimism, distrust and hatred can never be the driving force of change and development," However, some argued that Park's government should think about why the phrase "Hell Joseon" was born, because the term was coined during her presidency.

In January 2019, president Moon Jae-in's economic adviser  resigned after drawing public ire for saying that young, unemployed Korean language graduates who cannot find a job in Korea should stop blaming "Hell Joseon" and move to Southeast Asia to become Korean language teachers.

See also
Economy of South Korea
Gireogi appa
Parasite (2019 film)
Squid Game

References

External links 

South Korean culture
2010s neologisms
Korean slang
Korean words and phrases
Anti-capitalism